A Fortune for Kregen is a novel by Kenneth Bulmer published in 1979.

Plot summary
A Fortune for Kregen is a novel in which Dray Prescot is recovering from a wound suffered during a game of jikaida.

Publication history
After Bulmer badly bruised his arm in a fall, A Fortune for Kregen was published in December 1979, after which came A Victory for Kregen.

Reception
John T. Sapienza, Jr. reviewed A Fortune for Kregen for Different Worlds magazine and stated that "our hero escapes slavery and emerges from the moder to face his real enemy at the end of the book. The author seems to have had great fun, since the last chapter contains a suggestion that Prescot will return to Moderdrin again."

References

1979 British novels
1979 science fiction novels
British science fiction novels
DAW Books books